Samuel G. Iverson (April 21, 1859 – March 27, 1928) was an American politician, lawyer, and businessman.

Biography
Born in Rushford, Minnesota, Iverson went to the Rushford public schools and to the Shattuck Military School in Faribault, Minnesota. He worked as a store clerk. He served as postmaster for Rushford, Minnesota from 1881 to 1886. In 1887 and 1888, Iverson served in the Minnesota House of Representatives and was a Republican. He studied law at the University of Minnesota Law School and was admitted to the Minnesota bar in 1893. He served as deputy treasurer and then served as deputy auditor. He served in the Minnesota National Guard with the rank of lieutenant.

He married Calista Bentley Retel on April 24, 1900. She died in 1912.

From 1903 to 1915, Iverson served as Minnesota State Auditor. He ran for the Republican nomination for Governor of Minnesota. He lived in Saint Paul, Minnesota and was involved with the banking business. Iverson died at his sister's house in Saint Paul after a long illness.

Notes

1859 births
1928 deaths
People from Rushford, Minnesota
Politicians from Saint Paul, Minnesota
University of Minnesota Law School alumni
Military personnel from Minnesota
Businesspeople from Minnesota
Minnesota lawyers
State Auditors of Minnesota
Republican Party members of the Minnesota House of Representatives
19th-century American lawyers